Josimar Atoche (born 29 September 1989) is a Peruvian footballer who plays as a central midfielder for Cusco FC  in the Torneo Descentralizado.

Club career
Josimar Atoche started his career with Copa Perú side Unión Huaral in 2008.

In January 2010 he joined Alianza Atlético where he made his Torneo Descentralizado debut at home against Cienciano in the first round of the season. Manager Teddy Cardama put him in late in the game to wrap up the 2–1 win. Atoche made a total of 41 league appearances in his debut season in 2010.

In January 2011 Atoche signed for Juan Aurich, but a month later he was loaned out to his former club Alianza Atlético for the rest of the season, along with Israel Kahn.

References

External links

Josimar Atoche at ovacion.pe

 

1989 births
Living people
Peruvian footballers
Peruvian expatriate footballers
Academia Deportiva Cantolao players
Unión Huaral footballers
Alianza Atlético footballers
Juan Aurich footballers
José Gálvez FBC footballers
Club Alianza Lima footballers
Górnik Łęczna players
Cusco FC footballers
Peruvian Primera División players
Ekstraklasa players
Expatriate footballers in Poland
Peruvian expatriate sportspeople in Poland
Association football midfielders